The Young Americans College of the Performing Arts (YACPA; formerly: California Pacific College of the Performing Arts) is a performing arts conservatory in the Greater Los Angeles Area in the United States.

History
The school emerged from the performing group The Young Americans, which is closely affiliated. The college was formerly known as California Pacific College of the Performing Arts until it was renamed in 2010.

Admissions
Before a student is considered for admission into the college program, they must first audition and be accepted into The Young Americans.

Auditions
Auditions are held for high school juniors, seniors, and graduates.

Additional Admission Requirements
High School Completion & GPA:
Before an accepted student can begin enrolling, they must demonstrate high school completion with a GPA of 2.0 or higher. Students who do not meet the minimum GPA may be admitted on a conditional status.

Student Health:
Given the physical demands of The Young Americans prior to admission, all students are required to submit a report from a licensed physician attesting to their physical ability to withstand prolonged and rigorous physical activity.

The YACPA is located in Corona, California. Corona is located east of Orange County.

Associate of Arts in Performance
The Associate of Arts in Performance Degree is a two-year program of study.

See also
Alumni of The Young Americans.

References

External links

Dance schools in the United States
Drama schools in the United States
Music schools in California
Dance in California
Theatre in California